Thomas Geraghty may refer to:

 Thomas F. Geraghty, Associate Dean
 Thomas J. Geraghty (1883–1945), American screenwriter